Little Black Numbers is the second studio album by Kathryn Williams released by CAW Records in 2000 in the United Kingdom. It was the release that saw her nominated for the Mercury Music Prize and gain significant media exposure.in the UK.

The album is dedicated to the memory of her friend Mike Tunner with the song 'Fell Down Fast' concerning her reaction to his death and their friendship

The Kathryn Williams song entitled "Little Black Numbers" featured Williams's next album, Old Low Light.

Track listing

All songs written by Kathryn Williams except where stated.

 "We Dug A Hole" – 4:26
 "Soul To Feet" – 4:07
 "Stood" – 3:21
 "Jasmine Hoop" – 3:55
 "Fell Down Fast" – 5:36
 "Flicker" – 3:29
 "Intermission" (Laura Reid, Kathryn Williams) – 1:33
 "Tell The Truth As If It Were Lies" – 4:07
 "Morning Song" – 2:33
 "Toocan" – 2:24
 "Each Star We See" (Kathryn Williams, middle-eight and opening chords by Dan Moscardi) – 4:27
 "We Came Down From The Trees" – 3:46

Personnel
 Kathryn Williams - vocals, guitar
 Laura Reid - cello
 Alex Tustin - drums, congas, bongos, tambourine, shaker
 David Scott - classical guitar, vocals
 Jonny Bridgwood - double bass
 Laura Mundy - flute
 Emma Williams - vocals
 Mike Latham - vocals
 Dan Robinson - tablas
 Dan Moscardini - 12 string guitar, Hammond organ, vocals, glockenspiel
 Neil Le Flohic - vocals
 Amy Reid - saxophone
 Dan Robinson - piano

Recording details 
Recorded at Face Studios, Newcastle

Photography by Mark Winkley & Dean Bowen

References

External links

2000 albums
Kathryn Williams albums